Aliabad is a village and municipality in the Saatly District of Azerbaijan.

Description 
It has a population of 1,252.

References

External links

Populated places in Saatly District